Abigail Alice Glen (born 2 April 2001) is an English cricketer who currently plays for Yorkshire and Northern Diamonds. An all-rounder, she plays as a right-arm medium bowler and right-handed batter.

Early life
Glen was born on 2 April 2001 in Leeds.

Domestic career
Glen made her county debut in 2018, for Yorkshire against Somerset in the County Championship. She took 5 wickets in that season's Twenty20 Cup. She played six matches for the side in 2019, but did not play in 2021. In 2022, she played for both North Representative XI and Yorkshire in the Twenty20 Cup. She took five wickets in the competition, and made her maiden half-century, scoring 52* for Yorkshire against Derbyshire.

Glen was named in the Northern Diamonds squad for the 2022 season. She made her debut for the side on 14 May 2022, against Lightning in the Charlotte Edwards Cup. Overall, she played four matches for the side in 2022, all in the Charlotte Edwards Cup, scoring 39 runs and taking 2 wickets.

References

External links

2001 births
Living people
Cricketers from Leeds
Yorkshire women cricketers
North Representative XI cricketers
Northern Diamonds cricketers